Sabbadini is a surname. Notable people with the surname include:

 Marino Sabbadini (born 1969), Belgian footballer
 Remigio Sabbadini (1850–1934), Italian classical philologist
 Tino Sabbadini (1928–2002), French road bicycle racer

See also
 Sabadini
 Sabbatini

Surnames of Italian origin